Rho GTPase activating protein 21 is a protein that in humans is encoded by the ARHGAP21 gene.

Function

ARHGAP21 functions preferentially as a GTPase-activating protein (GAP) for CDC42 (MIM 116952) and regulates the ARP2/3 complex (MIM 604221) and F-actin dynamics at the Golgi through control of CDC42 activity (Dubois et al., 2005 [PubMed 15793564]). There is little scientific literature on ARHGAP21, but recent reviews highlighted that it plays an important role in cytoskeletal processes in cancer, substance transport within the cell, and insulin secretion

References

Further reading